The 1984 LPGA Tour was the 35th season since the LPGA Tour officially began in 1950. The season ran from January 26 to November 4. The season consisted of 36 official money events. Amy Alcott and Patty Sheehan won the most tournaments, four each. Betsy King led the money list with earnings of $266,771.

There were eight first-time winners in 1984: Sharon Barrett, Barb Bunkowsky, Cindy Hill, Christa Johnson, Betsy King, Sally Quinlan, Laurie Rinker, and Nayoko Yoshikawa.

The tournament results and award winners are listed below.

Tournament results
The following table shows all the official money events for the 1984 season. "Date" is the ending date of the tournament. The numbers in parentheses after the winners' names are the number of wins they had on the tour up to and including that event. Majors are shown in bold.

* - non-member at time of win

Awards

References

External links
LPGA Tour official site
1984 season coverage at golfobserver.com

LPGA Tour seasons
LPGA Tour